Gulocosa is a genus of spiders in the family Lycosidae. It was first described in 2015 by Marusik, Omelko & Koponen. , it contains only one species, the Russian species Gulocosa eskovi.

References

Lycosidae
Monotypic Araneomorphae genera
Spiders of Russia